The 1956–57 NCAA men's University Division basketball season began in December 1956. It progressed through the regular season and conference tournaments, and concluded with the 1957 NCAA University Division basketball tournament championship game on March 23, 1957, at Municipal Auditorium in Kansas City, Missouri. The North Carolina Tar Heels won their first NCAA national championship with a 54–53 triple-overtime victory over the Kansas Jayhawks.

Rule changes

 When teams lined up along the key for a free throw, it became mandatory that the two spaces adjacent to the end line be occupied by opponents of the player shooting the free throw. Previously, one player from each team occupied the spaces adjacent to the end line, with a player from the home team occupying a space marked "H" and a player from the visiting team occupying a space marked "V."
 Grasping the rim of the basket was deemed a form of unsportsmanlike conduct.

Season headlines 
 This was the first season in which NCAA basketball was split into two levels of play – the University Division for schools competing at the highest level of play and the College Division for teams playing at lower levels with limited or no scholarships. It also was the first season in which the NCAA held more than one championship tournament — one for the University Division and one for the College Division. In 1973, the University Division would be replaced by Division I and the College Division by Division II and Division III.
 The California Basketball Association was renamed the West Coast Athletic Conference. It would be renamed the West Coast Conference in 1989.
 In 1957, the Helms Athletic Foundation retroactively selected its national champions for the seasons from 1900–01 through 1918–19.

Season outlook

Pre-season polls 

The top 20 from the AP Poll and the UP Coaches Poll during the pre-season.

Conference membership changes

Regular season

Conference winners and tournaments

Informal championships

Statistical leaders

Post-season tournaments

NCAA tournament 

Frank McGuire brought the ACC its first National Championship as his undefeated North Carolina Tar Heels defeated Wilt Chamberlain and the Kansas Jayhawks in what is considered one of the best games in NCAA history – a 54–53 triple–overtime thriller. Chamberlain was named tournament Most Outstanding Player.

Final Four 
Played at Municipal Auditorium in Kansas City, Missouri

 Third Place – San Francisco 67, Michigan State 60

National Invitation tournament 

Bradley won its first NIT title, defeating Memphis State in a one-point contest. Memphis State's Win Wilfong won the MVP in a losing cause as he poured in 89 points in the Tigers' four games, including 31 in the final.

NIT Semifinals and Final 
Played at Madison Square Garden in New York City 

 Third Place – Temple 67, St. Bonaventure 50

Award winners

Consensus All-American teams

Major player of the year awards 

 Helms Foundation Player of the Year: Lennie Rosenbluth, North Carolina
 UPI Player of the Year: Chet Forte, Columbia

Major coach of the year awards 

 UPI Coach of the Year: Frank McGuire, North Carolina

Other major awards 

 Robert V. Geasey Trophy (Top player in Philadelphia Big 5): Guy Rodgers, Temple
 NIT/Haggerty Award (Top player in NYC): Chet Forte, Columbia

Coaching changes 

A number of teams changed coaches during the season and after it ended.

References